Herron Pharmaceuticals Pty Ltd is an Australian manufacturer of pharmaceutical and natural healthcare items. Herron is a subsidiary of Sigma Pharmaceuticals which was founded in 1912.

References

External links
 Official Herron Pharmaceuticals Website
 Official Sigma Pharmaceutical Website
  Herron Pharmaceuticals Pty Ltd at Bloomberg L.P.

Pharmaceutical companies established in 1972
Pharmaceutical companies of Australia
1972 establishments in Australia